Kari Seppo Juhani Markkanen (born January 8, 1952 in Espoo) is a Finnish sprint canoer who competed in the early to mid-1970s. Competing in two Summer Olympics, he earned his best finish of sixth in the K-2 500 m event at Montreal in 1976.

References
 Sports-reference.com profile

1952 births
Living people
Sportspeople from Espoo
Canoeists at the 1972 Summer Olympics
Canoeists at the 1976 Summer Olympics
Finnish male canoeists
Olympic canoeists of Finland